Btouratige, Btouratij, is a village in Koura District of Lebanon.

It was the residence of the murdered Lebanese security official Wissam al-Hassan.

References

External links
Btouratij, Localiban

Populated places in the North Governorate
Koura District
Sunni Muslim communities in Lebanon